The 1963 NBA draft was the 17th annual draft of the National Basketball Association (NBA). The draft was held on April 30 and May 7, 1963, before the 1963–64 season. In this draft, nine NBA teams took turns selecting amateur U.S. college basketball players. A player who had finished his four-year college eligibility was eligible for selection. If a player left college early, he would not be eligible for selection until his college class graduated. In each round, the teams select in reverse order of their win–loss record in the previous season. Before the draft, a team could forfeit its first-round draft pick and then select any player from within a 50-mile radius of its home arena as their territorial pick. The Chicago Zephyrs relocated to Baltimore and became the Baltimore Bullets prior to the draft. The Syracuse Nationals participated in the draft, but relocated to Philadelphia and became the Philadelphia 76ers prior to the start of the season. The draft consisted of 15 rounds comprising 84 players selected.  This draft holds the record for the fewest non-territorial picks who later debuted in the NBA, with 17 (18 if the territorial pick Tom Thacker is included).

Draft selections and draftee career notes
Tom Thacker from the University of Cincinnati was selected before the draft as Cincinnati Royals' territorial pick. Art Heyman from Duke University was selected first overall by the New York Knicks. Two players from this draft, Nate Thurmond and Gus Johnson, have been inducted to the Basketball Hall of Fame. Thurmond was also named in the 50 Greatest Players in NBA History list announced at the league's 50th anniversary in 1996. Thurmond's achievements include seven All-Star Game selections and five All-Defensive Team selections. Johnson's achievement include four All-NBA Team selections and five All-Star Game selections. Two players from this draft, 4th pick Eddie Miles and 13th pick Jim King, have also been selected to an All-Star Game.

Reggie Harding, who was the first player drafted out of high school when he was drafted the previous year, was drafted again by the Detroit Pistons with the 48th pick. He finally enter the league after spending a year in the Midwest Professional Basketball League (MPBL) due to the rules that prevent a high school player to play in the league until one year after his high school class graduated. Larry Brown from the University of North Carolina was selected with the 55th pick. However, he never played in the NBA. He spent his playing career within the Amateur Athletic Union (AAU) before joining the newly formed American Basketball Association (ABA) in 1967. He played there for five seasons, earning one All-ABA Team selection and three ABA All-Star Game selections. After his playing career, he became a head coach. He coached nine NBA teams, most recently with the Charlotte Bobcats (now Charlotte Hornets). He won the NBA championship with the Detroit Pistons in 2004 and went to the NBA Finals two other times; with the Philadelphia 76ers in 2001 and with the Pistons in 2005. In between his NBA coaching career, he also coached the Kansas Jayhawks of the University of Kansas for five seasons, winning the National Collegiate Athletic Association (NCAA) championship in 1988. He is the only coach to win both an NCAA title and an NBA championship. As a player, he won the gold medal with the United States national basketball team at the 1964 Olympic Games. He then coached the U.S. national team to a bronze medal at the 2004 Olympic Games, becoming the only U.S. male basketball participant to both play and coach in the Olympics. Rod Thorn, the 2nd pick, also had a coaching career. He was the interim head coach of the Chicago Bulls in 1982.

Key

Draft

Other picks

The following list includes other draft picks who have appeared in at least one NBA game.

Notable undrafted players
These players were not selected in the 1963 draft but played at least one game in the NBA.

Trades
 On September 14, 1962,  the Los Angeles Lakers acquired the a second-round pick from the Cincinnati Royals in exchange for Tom Hawkins. The Lakers used the pick to draft Jim King.

See also
 List of first overall NBA draft picks

References
General

Specific

External links
NBA.com
NBA.com: NBA Draft History

Draft
National Basketball Association draft
NBA draft
NBA draft
NBA draft
Basketball in New York City
Sporting events in New York City